Mohammed bin Hamad bin Dwaihi Al-Swaidan Al-Qahtani (born 23 July 2002) is a Saudi Arabian professional footballer who plays as a winger for Saudi Professional League side Al-Hilal. He was also part of the Saudi Arabia national team that participated in the 2021 FIFA Arab Cup.

Career
Al-Qahtani started his career at the youth teams of Al-Hilal. He signed his first professional contract with the club on 13 October 2020. He made his debut on 20 December 2021 in the King Cup match against Al-Raed. Al-Qahtani made his league debut on 25 December 2021 in the 3–2 loss to Al-Fateh.

Career statistics

Club

Honours

Club
Al-Hilal
 AFC Champions League: 2021
 Saudi Professional League: 2021–22

International
Saudi Arabia U23
WAFF U-23 Championship: 2022

References

External links
 

2002 births
Living people
Sportspeople from Riyadh
Association football wingers
Saudi Arabian footballers
Saudi Arabia youth international footballers
Saudi Arabia international footballers
Al Hilal SFC players
Saudi Professional League players